Roschon Johnson (born January 31, 2001) is an American football running back for the Texas Longhorns.

Early life and high school
Johnson was born in Port Arthur, Texas to Ronald and Schawanna Johnson. He has two older siblings in Dorian Johnson and Jeremiah Rose. During his early childhood, he would move to Groves, Texas and attend school in Port Neches, Texas later attending Port Neches–Groves High School. He completed 181 of 279 pass attempts for 2,918 yards and 35 touchdowns with five interceptions and also rushed 227 times for 1,627 yards and 29 touchdowns as a junior. Johnson passed 2,343 yards and 24 touchdowns while also rushing for 1,623 yards and 26 touchdowns in his senior season. He finished his high school career as Port Neches–Groves' all-time leading passer with 7,710 yards and finished second in school history with 4,900 rushing yards. Johnson was rated a four-star recruit and committed play college football at Texas over offers from Florida, Florida State, Ohio State, and Oklahoma.

College career
Johnson joined the Texas Longhorns as an early enrollee in January 2019 and participated in spring practices. He moved to running back during his freshman season due to injuries at the position. Johnson finished the season with 649 rushing yards and seven touchdowns on 123 carries and 158 receiving yards and one touchdown on 23 receptions. As a sophomore, Johnson served mostly as the Longhorns' second running back behind Bijan Robinson and rushed 80 times for 418 yards and six touchdowns and also caught eight passes for 51 yards and one touchdown. He rushed for 569 yards and five touchdowns on 96 carries in his junior season. Johnson graduated from the McCombs School of Business with a degree in business administration at the end of his junior year.

References

External links
Texas Longhorns bio

Living people
American football running backs
Texas Longhorns football players
Players of American football from Texas
People from Port Neches, Texas
2001 births